The United States Penitentiary, Administrative Maximum Facility (USP Florence ADMAX), commonly known as ADX Florence, is an American federal prison in Fremont County near Florence, Colorado. It is operated by the Federal Bureau of Prisons, a division of the United States Department of Justice. ADX Florence, which opened in 1994, is classed as a supermax or "control unit" prison, thus providing a higher, more controlled level of custody than a maximum security prison.

ADX Florence was commissioned when the Federal Bureau of Prisons needed a unit designed specifically for the secure housing of those prisoners most capable of extreme violence toward staff or other inmates. As of January 2023, there are a total of 322 inmates housed. They are confined 23 hours per day in single cells with facilities made of poured, reinforced concrete to deter self-harm, and are under 24-hour supervision, carried out intensively with high staff–inmate ratios.

Function 
The institution is unofficially known as ADX Florence or "the Alcatraz of the Rockies." It is part of the Federal Correctional Complex, Florence, run by the Federal Bureau of Prisons under the United States Department of Justice. The complex includes a minimum-security camp that,  holds more prisoners than the supermax unit. The number of inmates has declined, and as of 2021, two housing units have closed due to low population. The facility has a capacity of 551 inmates and had a population of 322 inmates as of January 26, 2023.

USP ADX Florence houses male inmates in the federal prison system deemed the most dangerous and in need of the tightest control, including prisoners whose escape would pose a serious threat to national security.

Women classified as a "special management concern" due to violence or escape attempts are confined at Federal Medical Center, Carswell in Fort Worth, Texas.

History 
In 1983, Thomas Silverstein and Clayton Fountain, members of the Aryan Brotherhood, fatally stabbed correctional officers Merle Clutts and Robert Hoffman at the United States Penitentiary, Marion. The stabbings took place only a few hours apart and were blamed on inadequate prison design.

Federal Bureau of Prisons director Norman Carlson proposed a new facility to isolate the most dangerous, uncontrollable inmates for security and safety. Under his leadership, USP Marion was operated in permanent lockdown, serving as a model for ADX as a control unit prison. Carlson believed that the prison would hold criminals who were desperate enough to murder corrections officers or other inmates in the hopes of being sentenced to death. He argued that as draconian as these measures were, they were the only way to deal with inmates who have "absolutely no concern for human life".

USP ADX Florence opened on January 10, 1995. The county already had nine prisons, but the lure of 750 to 900 permanent jobs (plus temporary jobs during the prison's construction) led residents to raise $160,000 to purchase  for the new prison. Hundreds of people attended the groundbreaking for the facility, which was designed by two leading architecture firms in Colorado Springs and cost $60 million to build.

Inmate population
The supermax unit at USP ADX Florence houses 324 male inmates as of March 8, 2023, each assigned to one of six security levels. It is designed for 490 inmates but has never been at full capacity.

The facility is best known for housing inmates who have been deemed too dangerous, too high-profile, or too great a security risk for even maximum-security prisons. For example, Joseph Romano was sentenced to life in federal prison for plotting to murder the judge and federal prosecutor who helped sentence him to 15 years in prison for masterminding a coin fraud operation. While in prison, he plotted to murder an undercover officer who had taken part in the investigation. When this came to light, Romano was transferred to USP ADX Florence.

The majority of current inmates, however, have been placed there because each has an extensive history in other prisons of committing violent crimes, including murder, against corrections officers and fellow inmates. These inmates are kept in administrative segregation. They are confined in a single-person cell for 23 hours a day. During their hour outside the cell, which can occur at any time of day or night, they are kept under restraint (handcuffed, shackled, or both). The hour outside of the cell is for exercise and a phone call if they have earned the privilege. Their diet is restricted to ensure that the food cannot be used to harm themselves or to create unhygienic conditions in their cell. Some cells have showers which further reduces the amount of handling of inmates that correctional officers have to perform.

After at least one year, depending on their conduct, inmates are gradually allowed out for longer periods. The long-term goal is to keep them at USP ADX Florence for no more than three years and then to transfer them to a less restrictive prison to serve the remainder of their sentences. According to a 1998 report in the San Francisco Chronicle, USP ADX Florence's main purpose is to "try and extract reasonably peaceful behavior from extremely violent career prisoners".

One cell block at Florence was once known as "Bombers Row" because five notable terrorists, four of whom are/were domestic terrorists, were held there: Timothy McVeigh, Terry Nichols, Ramzi Yousef, Eric Rudolph, and Ted Kaczynski.

Despite the extreme security measures to deter disruptive, violent, and dangerous behavior among inmates, there have been murders at ADX. Silvestre Rivera and Richard Santiago were both charged with the first degree murder of Manuel Torres, a high-level member of the Mexican Mafia. Left alone with no guard supervision in the prison yard on the morning of April 21, 2005, Rivera and Santiago were videotaped brutally beating and stomping Torres to death. Rivera pled not guilty due to self-defense. Prosecutors intended to seek the death penalty against Rivera and Santiago, but they were both given life sentences for the murders. Today, Santiago remains incarcerated at ADX, while Rivera is currently serving his life sentence in USP Hazleton.

In January 2021, a British judge ruled that Julian Assange could not be extradited to the US on the grounds that Assange would likely be housed at ADX, where there was a high risk he would commit suicide due to the conditions at the facility. This ruling was later overturned on appeal in December 2021.

Prison facility

ADX Florence is a  complex located at 5880 Highway 67, in an unincorporated area, with a Florence, Colorado, postal address. It is part of the Federal Correctional Complex, Florence (FCC Florence) which consists of three correctional facilities, each with a different security rating.

The majority of the facility is above ground, with the exception of a subterranean corridor that links cellblocks to the lobby. Each cell contains a desk, stool, and bed, constructed almost entirely of poured concrete, as well as a toilet that shuts off if blocked, a shower that runs on a timer to prevent flooding, and a sink lacking a potentially dangerous tap. Rooms may also be fitted with polished steel mirrors bolted to the wall, an electric light that can be shut off only remotely, a radio, and a television that shows recreational, educational, and religious programming.

The 4-inch-by-4-foot (10 cm × 1.2 m) windows are designed to prevent inmates from knowing their specific location within the complex. They can see only the sky and roof through them, so it is virtually impossible to plan an escape. Inmates exercise in a concrete pit resembling an empty swimming pool, also designed to prevent them from knowing their location in the facility. The pit is large enough only for a prisoner to walk ten steps in a straight line or thirty-one steps in a circle. Correctional officers generally deliver food to the cells. Inmates transferred to USP ADX Florence from other prisons may be allowed to eat in a shared dining room.

The prison as a whole contains a multitude of motion detectors, cameras, and 1,400 remote-controlled steel doors. Officers in the prison's control center monitor inmates twenty-four hours a day and can activate a "panic button", which immediately closes every door in the facility, should an escape attempt be suspected. Pressure pads and  razor-wire fences surround the perimeter, which is patrolled by heavily armed officers.

The facility houses inmates at six differing security levels: General Population Units ("Delta", "Echo", "Fox", and "Golf" Units), the Special Housing Unit (SHU), the Special Security Unit ("H" Unit), the Control Unit, Intermediate/Transitional Units ("Kilo" and "Joker" Units), and Range 13. Many of the security levels at ADX have special purposes or missions for the inmates who occupy them. The Control Unit houses inmates who have committed serious conduct violations or acts of violence at other institutions. It also houses high-level members of organizations deemed as threats, such as prison gangs. "H" Unit houses inmates who are members of terror groups so designated by the Department of Justice or who have had special administrative measures (SAMs) placed on them. Range 13 is a special four-cell wing within the Special Housing Unit for inmates in need of the tightest control. As of 2022, the only inmates publicly known to have been incarcerated in this unit are Thomas Silverstein and Ramzi Yousef. The two Intermediate Units house "step-down" inmates, who can earn transfer to another institution if they remain incident free while housed in the unit. This is the only unit in ADX where inmates secure themselves in their own cells, can walk freely in their range, and associate with other inmates. From there, inmates will typically be transferred to the supermax step-down unit in USP Florence High.

The Bureau of Prisons allowed the media to take a guided tour of USP ADX Florence on September 14, 2007. Attending reporters remarked on "an astonishing and eerie quiet" within the prison, as well as a sense of safety due to the rigorous security measures. 60 Minutes producer Henry Schuster said: "A few minutes inside that cell and two hours inside Supermax were enough to remind me why I left high school a year early. The walls close in very fast."

The prison has received far less criticism than comparable facilities at the state level (such as California's Pelican Bay State Prison) which tend to suffer from over-population, low staff-to-inmate ratios, and security issues. Jamie Fellner of Human Rights Watch said after a tour of the facility in 1998, "The Bureau of Prisons has taken a harsh punitive model and implemented it as well as anybody I know."

Controversies
In 2012, eleven inmates filed a federal class-action suit against the Bureau of Prisons in Cunningham v. Federal Bureau of Prisons. The suit alleged chronic abuse and failure to properly diagnose prisoners who are seriously mentally ill. At the time of the lawsuit, at least six inmates had allegedly died by suicide; a seventh did so after the original lawsuit was filed, and an amended filing added him to the case.

Critics claim that the use of extended confinement in solitary cells adversely affects prisoners' mental health; numerous studies support this conclusion.  settlement negotiations were underway with the help of a federal magistrate. Some changes have already been made by the Bureau of Prisons.

Prisoners held in Unit H are subject to special administrative measures that prevent them from communicating with journalists or privately with their own lawyers or family members.

In 2020, a British magistrate refused to extradite Julian Assange to the United States on espionage charges in part because he would possibly be subjected to solitary confinement and special administrative measures at ADX. On July 7, 2021, the High Court of Justice for England and Wales agreed to allow the United States to appeal this decision with the understanding that Assange "will not be subject to SAMs or imprisoned at ADX" if he is extradited.

Suicides at the prison
At least eight inmates have died, or are suspected of having died, by suicide at the facility.

Notable current inmates

Foreign terrorists
This list contains foreign citizens who committed or attempted to commit terrorist attacks against United States citizens and interests. All sentences are without parole.

Domestic terrorists
This list contains U.S. citizens, regardless of origin, who committed or attempted to commit terrorist attacks against United States citizens and interests.

Espionage

Organized crime figures

Other crimes

In popular culture 

 The American crime drama series Better Call Saul features a fictional federal prison based on ADX Florence named "ADX Montrose", located in Montrose, Colorado, where protagonist Saul Goodman is serving a life sentence. Scenes for ADX Montrose were shot at the Penitentiary of New Mexico.

See also 

 List of U.S. federal prisons
 Federal Medical Center, Carswell, contains an Administrative Unit which is the equivalent to the ADX for federal female inmates. It also houses female federal inmates sentenced to death.
 Special Handling Unit, a supermax prison operated by Corrections Canada
 HM Prison Belmarsh, a UK high security prison operated by His Majesty's Prison Service. A High Security Unit (HSU), akin to a supermax, is contained within the prison grounds.
 List of former inmates at USP Florence ADMAX

References

Further reading
 Vick, Karl. "Isolating the Menace in a Sterile Supermax". The Washington Post. Sunday September 30, 2007.

External links

 Official website of Federal Bureau of Prisons and its section on USP ADX Florence. Information on visiting is on the linked PDF
 "Supermax: A Clean Version of Hell". CBS News. October 14, 2007. Updated on June 19, 2009.

1994 establishments in Colorado
Buildings and structures in Fremont County, Colorado
Government buildings completed in 1994
Prisons in Colorado
Supermax prisons
Towers in Colorado
United States Penitentiaries